George Ross may refer to:

Politics
 George Ross (American politician) (1730–1779), signatory to the U.S. Declaration of Independence
 George Ross (Pennsylvania candidate), candidate for U.S. House of Representatives in 1884 and 1888 and U.S. Senate in 1893
 George Ross (Pennsylvania statesman) (1746–1801), Lt. Governor of Pennsylvania, 1788–1790
 George William Ross (1841–1914), Canadian educator and politician
 George A. Ross (1854–1888), lawyer and political figure in Nova Scotia, Canada
 George Henry Ross (1878–1956), politician and barrister from Alberta, Canada
 George T. Ross (1949–2020), member of the Massachusetts House of Representatives
 George Ross (farmer) (1829–1876), New Zealand farmer and provincial politician

Sports
 George Ross (footballer, born 1869) (1869–1928), footballer who played for Bury in two FA Cup finals
 George Ross (gymnast) (1877–1945), British gymnast and Olympic medalist
 George Ross (baseball) (1892–1935), Major League Baseball pitcher
 George Ross (Australian footballer) (1901–1989), played with Richmond in the VFL
 George Ross (footballer, born 1943) (1943–2016), Scottish footballer, notably with Preston

Other
 George Ross, 11th Lord Ross (died 1682), Scottish nobleman and soldier
 George Ross, 13th Lord Ross (1681–1754), Scottish nobleman
 George Allen Ross (1879–1946), Canadian architect
 George Berkeley Ross (1918–2006), pioneer of information technology in the American petroleum industry
 George Campbell Ross (1900–1993), engineer and Royal Navy admiral
 George H. Ross (born 1928), American businessman, officer of the Trump Organization
 George Ronald Ross (1914–2008), British businessman in Hong Kong